Baraboule is a department or commune of Soum Province in north-western Burkina Faso. Its capital lies at the town of Baraboule.

References

Departments of Burkina Faso
Soum Province